Nicole Peissl (born 26 July 1971) is an Austrian handball player.  

She competed at the 1992 Summer Olympics, where Austria placed 5th.

References

1971 births
Living people

Austrian female handball players
Olympic handball players of Austria
Handball players at the 1992 Summer Olympics